The Pack Theater is a theatre based in Los Angeles, California, specializing in improv and sketch comedy. In addition, the theatre operates a school for developing improv and comedy talent.

The Pack Theater grew out of the Miles Stroth Workshop, "focused on advanced training for improv comedians." Miles Stroth, a former student of Del Close, founded the workshop in 2007 after leaving his teaching job at iO West. He spun the workshop into a theatre working from a 50-seat black box in 2016.

For each of its first four years, 2016–19, the Pack has hosted its own comedy festival, Pack Con. Pack Con performers have included Bob Odenkirk, Adam McKay, and The Whitest Kids U Know.

References

2010s in comedy
2016 establishments in California
Improvisational theatre
Theatres in Los Angeles